Hildebrando Pascoal Nogueira Neto (born 17 January 1952), popularly known as the Deputado Motosserra (chainsaw representative), is a Brazilian politician and former colonel of Acre State's Military Police. He was elected as a federal representative of the PFL, but was expelled by his party after his criminal activity came to light.

He is best known for his brutality, including dismemberment by chainsaw, then killing with either a stake or bullet through the head.

Crimes and career 

Hildebrando worked most of his career in the Military Police, earning the rank of commander and then colonel. He then was elected State Representative in 1994, with the support of Orleir Cameli and Ronivon Santiago (both of whom have also been investigated for corruption). As early as 1995, Brazilian human rights groups and the Ministry of Justice (Brazil) were investigating Hildebrando. During these early periods, there were widespread reports that he dismembered victims with a chainsaw and participated in the drug trafficking trade he was tasked with fighting. However, during this investigation, most of the witnesses were assassinated, including a former accomplice of Hildebrando named Sebastião Crispim. He was found dismembered with his eyes torn out. Another witness was kidnapped with his two sons, ruthlessly tortured, and then killed. Others were killed and then dissolved in acid.

His most famous killing was of the Baiano, Agilson Firmino dos Santos. He was a mechanic that was rumored to have participated in the killing of Hildebrando's brother. He tortured Santos and chopped him to pieces with a chainsaw.

While leading the criminal enterprise in the state, he participated in violent and horrific methods of enforcing his criminal rule. "One witness said he accompanied Mr Pascoal across the border to Bolivia, where the congressman picked up nearly 1,000 kg of cocaine. The same witness said that under orders from his boss, he helped to kill 10 people."

Attempt at national politics 

Despite these accusations, Hildebrando was elected as a Federal Representative to the Chamber of Deputies in 1998. A few months later, in 1999, Hildebrando was forced to resign after official charges were levied against him.

Sentence 

In 2006 (and reaffirmed in 2009), Hildebrando was convicted of murder, attempted murder, kidnapping, torture, electoral corruption, leading a death squad in Acre, and coordinating an organized crime operation for drug trafficking and cargo theft. He has been sentenced to serve 18.5 years in prison. However, with cases still pending, he could face more than 100 years.

References 

1952 births
Brazilian politicians
People from Rio Branco, Acre
Living people
Brazilian politicians convicted of crimes